A bully is someone responsible for bullying, using aggression to intimidate or dominate others.

Bully may also refer to:

Animals
 American Bully, a breed of dog
 Bull Terrier or bully, a breed of dog
 Gobiomorphus or bully, an Australian and New Zealand genus of fish

Film and television

Film
The Bully, a 1918 film produced by Ebony Film Corporation
 Bullies (film), a 1986 Canadian film
 Bully (2001 film), an American film by Larry Clark
 Bully (2011 film), an American documentary about bullying
 Bully (2017 film), an American musical featurette

Television
 "Bully" (The Brak Show), a 2002 episode
 "Bully" (Law & Order: Special Victims Unit), a 2011 episode
 "Bully" (New Girl), a 2012 episode
 "Bully", an episode of the TV series Heartstopper
 "Bullies" (The Newsroom), a 2012 episode
 "The Bully" (Kate & Allie), a 1986 episode
 "The Bully" (SpongeBob SquarePants), a 2001 episode
 Bully, the mascot of the British game show Bullseye

Music
 Bully (band), an American rock band
 Bully, an album by Sugarbomb, 2001

Songs
 "Bully" (song), by Shinedown, 2012
 "Bully", by Eminem from Straight from the Lab, 2003
 "Bully", by Gob from Foot in Mouth Disease, 2003
 "Bully", by Judie Tzuke from Secret Agent, 1998
 "Bully", by Three Days Grace from Life Starts Now, 2009
 "The Bully", by Sia from Colour the Small One, 2004

People with the nickname
 Wally Bullington (1931–2018), American college football player and coach
 Big Bully Busick (1954–2018), American police officer turned professional wrestler
 Bully Dawson (fl. 17th century), English gambler
 Bully Gilstrap (fl. mid-20th century), American college athlete and coach
 Bully Hayes (1827/9–1877), American slaver and sea captain
 Michael Herbig (born 1968), German film director, actor and author
 Gray Maynard (born 1979), American mixed martial artist
 William T. Van de Graaff (1895–1977), American college football player and coach
 Robert Waterman (sea captain) (1808–1884), American merchant sea captain

Places
 Bully, Loire, France
 Bully, Rhône, France
 Bully, Seine-Maritime, France
 Bully-les-Mines, France
 Bully Creek (Malheur River tributary), Oregon, US

Sports
 Bully (mascot), mascot of the Mississippi State University Bulldogs athletics teams
 Columbus Bullies, a professional American football team 1938–1942
 Jacksonville Bullies, a professional indoor lacrosse team 2012

Other uses
 Bully (video game), a 2006 action-adventure game
 The Bully: A Discussion and Activity Story, a 2003 children's book by Rita Y. Toews 
 The Bully, a 2002 novel in The Bluford Series
 Bully beef, a type of salt-cured beef product
 Sideroxylon, or bully trees
 Volkswagen Type 2, a panel van nicknamed "Bully"

Lists of people by nickname